Surendranagar Junction railway station belongs to Western Railway of Rajkot Division. It is located in Surendranagar district of Gujarat state.

History
Sir Lakhdhiraji Waghji, who ruled from 1922 until 1948, acted as a ruler, manager, patron and policeman of the state with great authority. Sir Waghji, like other contemporary rulers of Saurashtra, built roads and a railway network (of seventy miles), connecting Wadhwan and Morbi. Surendranagar–Rajkot section was laid in 1905. Gauge conversion of Viramgam–Hapa section via Surendranagar, Wankaner was completed by 1980. Morvi State Railway was merged into the Western Railway on 5 November 1951.

Passenger amenities
About 108  passenger trains arrive at this station. There were trains Mumbai,
,
Delhi, Gandhidham, Wankaner etc.,

References

Railway stations in Surendranagar district
Rajkot railway division
Railway junction stations in Gujarat
Railway stations opened in 1905
1905 establishments in India